Come over to My House is a 1966 children's book written by Dr. Seuss and illustrated by Richard Erdoes. The name "Theo. LeSieg" was a pen name of Theodor Geisel, who is more commonly known by another pen name, Dr. Seuss.

The illustrations portray the various styles of homes that kids from around the world live in along with Seuss's recognizable verse. Throughout the book they also cover what kids eat, how they sleep (Japanese wooden pillows), play (sledding on pine needles), and even clean-up afterwards (Polynesian hot spring).

The book was the 44th in the Beginner Books series, in between B-43: You Will Live Under the Sea (1966) by F. & M. Phleger and B-45: Babar Loses His Crown (1967), by Laurent de Brunhoff.

1966 children's books
Books by Dr. Seuss
Random House books